Burchard is an unincorporated community in Lyon County, in the U.S. state of Minnesota.

History
Burchard was laid out in 1886 by the railroad.  It was named for H. M. Burchard, a railroad official.

A post office was established in Burchard in 1886, and remained in operation until it was discontinued in 1945.

References

Unincorporated communities in Lyon County, Minnesota
Unincorporated communities in Minnesota